is an airport located  east southeast of Wakkanai, Hokkaidō, Japan.

Wakkanai is the northernmost airport in Japan that is capable of handling jet aircraft; due to its small size, it is susceptible to closures during the coldest winter months, in which case incoming aircraft are often diverted to Asahikawa Airport. It has one jet bridge, one apron gate for mid-sized jet aircraft, and two apron gates for commuter aircraft.

History
Wakkanai Airport opened to passenger traffic in 1960, initially on an irregular basis. Air Nippon began scheduled service to Okadama Airport and Rishiri Airport in 1974, followed by Rebun Airport in 1978 and New Chitose Airport in 1980. Air Nippon discontinued the short Rebun and Rishiri commuter flights in 2003 due to poor load factors.

In 1987, the 1,200 m main runway was extended to 1,800 m, allowing All Nippon Airways to begin jet service to Tokyo. The flight was initially seasonal and did not become a year-round service until 1997. The city of Wakkanai provided subsidies for city residents to use the flight until 2005, when discounted fares became available.

As of 2022, ANA has two scheduled daily round trips to Sapporo using Bombardier Q400 turboprops, and one scheduled daily round trip to Tokyo (two from June to September) using Boeing 737 and Airbus A321 jets.

Airlines and destinations

Ground transportation
The airport is located on Japan National Route 238. However, since there is the runway, passengers cannot directly enter the airport terminal from the road. 12 km from central Wakkanai.

Busses 
 Airport Terminal Bus stop
This bus stop is located near the airport.

 Jidōsha Gakkō-mae Bus stop　自動車学校前
This bus stop is located on Japan National Route 238 in front of the Wakkanai Driving School. It takes about 10 minutes from here to this bus stop on foot through Hokkaido Prefectural Road Route 1059 and 121.

Railway
Until 1989, the JNR Tempoku Line passed by the airport; however, the airport did not have a station on the line except for one day in June 1987, when a temporary Higashi-Koetoi Station was opened to accommodate visitors to the airport's extended runway.

References

External links
 Wakkanai Airport Terminal (in Japanese)

Airports in Hokkaido
Wakkanai, Hokkaido
Airports established in 1960
1960 establishments in Japan